Alim Abdul-Kerimovich Karkayev (born 28 January 1985) is a Russian former professional football player.

Club career
He made his Russian Football National League debut for FC Kuban Krasnodar on 16 October 2006 in a game against FC Salyut-Energiya Belgorod. He played 5 seasons in the FNL for Kuban, FC Anzhi Makhachkala, FC Chernomorets Novorossiysk, FC Angusht Nazran and PFC Spartak Nalchik.

External links
 

1985 births
Sportspeople from Nalchik
Living people
Russian footballers
FC Kuban Krasnodar players
FC Anzhi Makhachkala players
FC Chernomorets Novorossiysk players
FC Sibir Novosibirsk players
FC Tyumen players
FC Angusht Nazran players
PFC Spartak Nalchik players
FC Armavir players
Association football utility players